Bad Habits is the debut album released by Australian artist Billy Field in 1981. It spent 2 weeks at the top of the Australian album charts in 1981.

David Lee Roth recorded a version of Field's "Baby I'm Easy" for his 1986 debut solo album Eat 'Em and Smile and later also the album's title track for his 2003 album "Diamond Dave".

Track listing

Side one
 "Bad Habits" - 3:26
 "Good Golly Me" - 2:58
 "You Weren't in Love with Me" - 3:24
 "Baby I'm Easy" - 2:16
 "Never Be Blue"  - 2:41

Side two
 "Since I Found Out" - 3:42
 "You'll Call It Love" - 4:25
 "Celebrity Lane" - 2:41
 "Single Man"  - 2:37
 "If I Was a Millionaire" - 3:04

Charts

Weekly charts

Year-end charts

References

External links
 Bad Habits at Discogs

1981 albums